Joseph Cornelius Oakley (28 January 1914 – 8 December 1980) was an Australian rules footballer who played with Essendon in the Victorian Football League (VFL).

Family
The son of Joseph Thomas Oakley (1890–1959), and Theresa Veronica Oakley (1894–1988), née Yee Kee, Joseph Cornelius Oakley was born at Carlton, Victoria on 28 January 1914.

He married Florence Eugenia Dillon (1916–2008) in 1942.

Football

Essendon (VFL)
Recruited from Sunbury, he played 2 games, and kicked  2 goals, for the Essendon First XVIII in 1934.

Military service
Oakley later served in the Australian Army during World War II.

Notes

References  
 
 Maplestone, M., Flying Higher: History of the Essendon Football Club 1872–1996, Essendon Football Club, (Melbourne), 1996. 
 
 A14472, VX144515: World War Two Service Record: Craftsman Joseph Cornelius Oakley (VX144515), National Archives of Australia.

External links 
		

1914 births
1980 deaths
Australian rules footballers from Melbourne
Essendon Football Club players
Australian Army personnel of World War II
Australian Army soldiers
People from Carlton, Victoria
Military personnel from Melbourne